Alexander Haggerty Krappe (6 July 1894 – 30 November 1947) was a folklorist and writer. Along with Francis Peabody Magoun, he was the first  translator of folktales collected by the Brothers Grimm into the English language. He was also a linguist, teacher, translator of scientific and other materials, a Roman philologist, a comparative mythologist, a classicist and Scandinavianist.

Despite his contributions and academic writing, his work has been overlooked in the modern Folklore discipline as he staunchly denied the existence of American Folklore.

Biography 
Alexander Haggerty Krappe was born in Boston, Massachusetts in 1884. His childhood was said to be unhappy, and after his parents divorced, he was taken back to Europe by his German-born father. Krappe received his education in the Leibniz und Siemen's Oberealschuel in Charlottenberg, Berlin. An accomplished student, he remained at the university until 1915 upon his decision to study modern languages. Thus Krappe spent 1915-1916 studying medieval history and Romance languages at the University of Berlin.

Krappe went on to enter the University of Iowa in Iowa City on a graduate fellowship, and received his M.A. with a major in French and a minor in Italian. The capstone of his M.A., his thesis was entitled "The Chronology of the old French Chanson de Geste." In January 1918, he began doctoral work at the University of Chicago on another graduate fellowship. In 1919, Krappe received a Ph.D. His work in university established his interest in epic and medieval literature.

In 1919, Krappe married Edith Smith, the daughter of Folklorist Grace Partridge Smith. Edith would go on to describe her husband as "brilliant, but deeply troubled and enigmatic man when all of the sources are combined, it is the picture that emerges."

Krappe died on November 30, 1947 in Iowa City, Iowa, leaving three book-length manuscripts. The most significant of these, and only one published, was a translation of Grimm's Collected Fairy Tales in conjunction with Francis Peabody Magoun.

Krappe's definition of folklore 
In his book The Science of Folklore he stated:
Folklore is a historical science, having its own methods of research and admitting of the same system of checks and verifications as any other. With its sister sciences it may combine to make up the cycle of our knowledge of man's past life. From this follows that it may assume the rank of an ancillary science to any or all of them, and it has done so repeatedly, notably to the various philogies, history, ethnography, and the history of religion.

Krappe's definition of folksong 
Krappe's work also extended into the field of folksong, his own scholarly definition "The folksong is a song, i.e a lyric poem with melody, which originated anonymously, among unlettered folk in times past and which remained in currency for a considerable time, as a rule for centuries . . . The American Kentucky Home, though it is supposed to have originated in circle of a somewhat darker hue than is popular in certain sections of the country, is a genuine folksong of both colored and white people"

This also serves as a prime example of Krappe's unpopularity among Folklorists and anthropologists, as Krappe's work many times shows him to be racist and sexist.

Works

References

Obituary

Further reading
 
 

Folklorists
Comparative mythologists
19th-century births
1947 deaths
Writers from Boston
American people of German descent
Humboldt University of Berlin alumni
University of Iowa alumni
University of Chicago alumni
Translators from German
20th-century American translators
Writers on Germanic paganism
American expatriates in Germany